Nurul Haque Manik (25 June 1964 – 14 June 2020) was a Bangladeshi footballer who played as an attacking midfielder. He was a prominent figure in the Bangladesh national football team for ten years and spent most of his club career playing for Dhaka League giants Mohammedan Sporting Club and Brothers Union.

Early life
Mohammad Nurul Haque Manik was born in Matlab Uttar Upazila , Chandpur, Bangladesh and spent his childhood there. His father's name was AKM Mozammel Haque, who was an accountant in the Public Works Department. Manik moved to Dhaka with his family for his father's job. It was through his father that he became involved in football.

Club career
Manik started his career with Arambagh KS in 1985. He spent two years with the club and was named as their captain in 1987, which ended up being his last season with the club. He joined Fakirerpool in 1987 and was named their captain in 1988, only one year after joining. Manik went on to sign a contract with Brothers Union, where he spent three years and was also made the club's captain in 1991. He captained The Oranges to the 1991 Federation Cup trophy, and in the same year he joined Kolkata Mohammedan in the Calcutta League. Manik ended his career with Mohammedan Sporting Club in 1998; he spent 5 years at the club and was again made captain in 1995. He also played for Abahani Limited as a guest player when they faced East Bengal Club of India at Dhaka in the 1991–92 Asian Cup Winners' Cup. After his retirement Manik started his coaching career under Bangladesh Football Federation (BFF).

International career
In 1987, Manik made his international debut for Bangladesh. His greatest moment with the national team came during the 1989 South Asian Games, when Bangladesh took on India.Manikhe scored the opening goal of the match and helped the country get through to the finals, however, the game ended in huge controversy, when Bangladesh captain Elias Hossain was suspended from playing international games after getting into a fight with the referee. Manik retired from international football on March 31, 1997, when Bangladesh lost 1–0 to Malaysia at the Prince Abdullah Al Faisal Stadium in Jeddah, Saudi Arabia, during which he played full 90 minutes.

Personal life
On 14 June 2020, at the age of 55, Manik died in Dhaka, Bangladesh, after being infected with COVID-19.

Honours

Brothers Union
 Federation Cup: 1991

Kolkata Mohammedan
 Sait Nagjee Trophy: 1991

Dhaka Mohammedan
 Dhaka League: 1993, 1996
 Federation Cup: 1995

Bangladesh
 South Asian Games Silver medal: 1989

References

1964 births
2020 deaths
Bangladeshi footballers
Bangladesh international footballers
Bangladeshi expatriate footballers
Association football midfielders
Brothers Union players
Mohammedan SC (Dhaka) players
Arambagh KS players
Bangladeshi expatriate sportspeople in India
Calcutta Football League players
People from Chandpur District
South Asian Games medalists in football
South Asian Games silver medalists for Bangladesh
Deaths from the COVID-19 pandemic in Bangladesh